7 Weeks: Live in America, 2003 is the eighth release and first live album by Christian metal band Stryper. Released on May 18, 2004, it was recorded during the band's reunion tour in 2003. A live DVD, titled Stryper: Live in Puerto Rico was recorded during the band's sold out show in San Juan, Puerto Rico and was supposed to be released alongside the live album. The DVD was finally released on September, 2006.

Track listing
 Sing-Along Song
 Makes Me Wanna Sing
 Calling on You
 Free
 More Than a Man
 Caught in the Middle
 Reach Out
 Loud N Clear
 The Way
 Soldiers Under Command
 To Hell with the Devil
 Honestly
 Winter Wonderland
 Closing Prayer

References

Stryper albums
2004 live albums
Live heavy metal albums
Live glam metal albums